The Expédition d'Irlande was a French attempt to invade Ireland in December 1796 during the French Revolutionary Wars. Encouraged by representatives of the Society of United Irishmen, an Irish republican organisation, the French Directory decided that the best strategy for eliminating Britain from the war was to invade Ireland, then under British control. It was hoped that a substantial invasion in the summer of 1796 would encourage a widespread uprising among the Irish population and force the British to abandon Ireland, providing a major strategic and propaganda coup for the French Republic and a staging point for a subsequent invasion of Britain. Assigned to lead the operation was General Lazare Hoche, the Republic's most successful military commander, who was provided with a significant body of troops and the services of the entire French Atlantic fleet.[A]

Preparation for the invasion was slow throughout the autumn, and it was not until December that the force was ready to leave Brest. The delay was principally the result of poor organisation and discipline within the French Navy, and preparations were only completed once the commander at Brest, Vice-amiral Villaret de Joyeuse, had been replaced with Vice-amiral Morard de Galles and Hoche given direct command of discipline within the fleet. Departing Brest on 15 December, the French invasion fleet was almost immediately scattered: a combination of bad weather, inexperience at sea and the depredations of British frigates dispersing the force and destroying one ship of the line. As separate ships and small squadrons made their way independently to the rendezvous point off Mizen Head, the flagship frigate Fraternité was chased deep into the Atlantic by a British frigate and took more than a week to return to Ireland. In that time the rest of the fleet, buffeted by the worst winter storms since 1708, broke up off the landing beaches in Bantry Bay, the weather too fierce to allow any amphibious landings.

By the last week of December 1796 the fleet was in full retreat, having failed to land a single soldier in Ireland. Several ships were wrecked or foundered in heavy seas, and a British frigate squadron based at Cork managed to seize a number of lone frigates and transports during the first two weeks of January. The main British fleet, although ordered to intercept the invasion force, made little progress and did not arrive in the Western Approaches until 13 January, by which time all except three French ships had been accounted for. Two, including the flagship Fraternité, were chased by the British fleet, eventually reaching safety at Rochefort. The third, the ship of the line Droits de l'Homme, was intercepted by two British frigates led by Captain Sir Edward Pellew and destroyed in a running action that cost the lives of over 1,000 Frenchmen.

In total, French losses were 12 ships captured or destroyed and over 2,000 men drowned. The Brest fleet was so badly damaged by the operation that they launched no major operations during 1797 and were unable to respond when the British fleet was paralysed by the Spithead Mutiny a few months later. A second French attempt to invade Ireland was launched in the summer of 1798, in response to the Irish Rebellion, but this too ended in disaster: all of the men landed were captured a few weeks later at the Battle of Ballinamuck. A third and final invasion effort was defeated and destroyed by a British squadron at the Battle of Tory Island in October 1798.

Order of battle

Notes

A. Sources vary on the exact number of French troops that eventually participated in the campaign. Pakenham gives 12,000, Clowes, James, Woodman and Henderson suggest 18,000 (although James quotes estimates between 16,200 and 25,000), while Regan and Come indicate approximately 20,000, although Come comments that they were of low quality.

References

Bibliography
 
 
 
 
 
  Rev. ed.
 
 

1796 in Ireland
Wars involving Ireland
Naval battles of the French Revolutionary Wars
Naval battles involving Great Britain
Naval battles involving France
Conflicts in 1796
Conflicts in 1797
1796 in France
1797 in France
French Revolutionary Wars orders of battle